Nepantla is a concept used in Chicano and Latino anthropology, social commentary, criticism, literature and art. It represents a concept of "in-between-ness." Nepantla is a Nahuatl word which means "in the middle of it" or "middle."  It may refer specifically to the space between two figurative or literal bodies of water. In contemporary usage, Nepantla often refers to being between two cultures, particularly one's original culture and the dominant one. It usually refers to a position of perspective, power, or potential, but it is sometimes used to designate a state of pain or loss.

History 

Nepantla was a term that was first used by Nahuas in Central Mexico, especially the Triple Alliance of Anahuac. Book 6 of the Florentine Codex preserves the knowledge of the "ilamatlācah" or wise old women:"Tlachichiquilco in tihuih in tinemih tlālticpac: nipa centlami, nipa centlami. In tlā nipa xiyāuh in tlā noceh nipa xiyāuh ōmpa tonhuetziz: zan tlanepantlah in huīlōhua in nemōhua."
 "We travel along a mountain ridge while we live on earth, an abyss yawning on either side. If you stray too far one way or the other, you will fall away. Only by keeping to the middle way does one walk on and live."

The term was further refined by Nahuatl-speaking people in Mexico (Aztecs) during the 16th century. During this time, they were being colonized by the Spaniards and the concept of being "in between" was useful to describe how the experience felt. Some attribute the concept directly to the colonized Aztec, and others have attributed anthropologist, Miguel Leon-Portilla (1926–2019), as first describing the concept. Leon-Portilla further describes how indigenous people who were conquered by the Spanish created their own "in between" culture. They would leave behind aspects of their culture that they could not synthesize into the new culture.

Uses

Political 
Nepantla can be described as a "liminal" space, where multiple forms of reality are viewed at the same time. This concept can be useful when addressing multicultural groups of people, where finding consensus can be difficult. Allowing individuals to examine concepts that seem to compete and understanding both is also a process of using nepantla.

Nepantla can also describe individuals or groups who are today in conflict with a larger, perhaps more globally reaching culture or ideology. Nepantla has also been identified as a tool for political change. Individuals who live within two different "worlds" or "cultures" can act as a "fulcrum" to engage in political change.

Written 
Gloria E. Anzaldúa writes about Nepantla in the context of the writing process. In her book Borderlands/La Frontera, she says, “it is one of the stages of writing, the stage where you have all these ideas, all these images, sentences and paragraphs, and where you are trying to make them into one piece, a story, plot or whatever—it is all very chaotic.”  Nepantla in the general definition is a space, and in this context, it is the space of construction in the writing process.

Artistic 
In the arts, nepantla is a creator's imaginary world that encompasses historical, emotional and spiritual aspects of life. Nepantla as a term might also refer to living in the borderlands or being at literal or metaphorical crossroads.

Emotional 
Nepantla as a concept has also been identified as a painful experience, where a person's sense of self has been "shattered." It can also signify a personal state of "invisibility and transition."  Anzaldúa described nepantla as time where individuals experience a loss of control and suffer anxiety and confusion as a result.

Quotes 
"The world is in a constant state of Nepantla."—Maria E. Fránquiz

“Now I call [the concept of borders and borderlands] Nepantla, which is a Nahuatl word for the space between two bodies of water, the space between two worlds.  It is a limited space, a space where you are not this or that but where you are changing” - Gloria E. Anzaldúa

"Living between cultures results in 'seeing' double, first from the perspective of one culture, then from the perspective of another. Seeing from two or more perspectives simultaneously renders those cultures transparent. Removed from that culture's center you glimpse the sea in which you've been immersed but to which you were oblivious, no longer seeing the world the way you were enculturated to see it."—Gloria E. Anzaldúa

"You're experiencing nepantla. We feel that in South Texas. We have these two cultures coalescing, and this third one emerges. We eat hot dogs and tacos. We drink hot chocolate and Lone Star Beer." -- Santa Barraza

References

External links 
 Nepantla
 What is Nepantla?

Nahuatl words and phrases
Mexican-American history
Chicano literature